Alloclinus is a genus of blennies in the family Labrisomidae. It is monotypic, being represented by the single species, Alloclinus holderi, commonly known as the island kelpfish. Alloclinus holderi is a subtropical species native to the eastern Pacific Ocean from Santa Cruz Island, California, to Baja California. The specific name honours the American naturalist, conservationist and author Charles Frederick Holder (1851-1915).

References

Labrisomidae
Monotypic fish genera
Western North American coastal fauna
Taxa named by Carl Leavitt Hubbs